Dot Dot News is a pro-Beijing online media outlet located in Hong Kong, established in 2016. It has a close relationship with pro-Beijing newspaper Wen Wei Po, sharing the same office in Hing Wai Industrial Centre in Tin Wan.

Following the death of a protester who fell from the Pacific Place shopping mall on 15 June 2019 after standing on the fourth-floor platform for five hours, Dot Dot News published an article the next day, alleging that LegCo politician Roy Kwong phoned the victim and encouraged him to commit suicide at the scene. Kwong denounced the article as fake news, saying that the practice of fabricating charges against a victim was despicable. Kwong also rebuked the accusations, stating that police prevented him, a registered social worker, from counselling the man to encourage him to return to a safer spot. In early September 2019, Facebook introduced the fact check mechanism in Hong Kong, in the hope of suppressing fake news via collaboration with Agence France-Presse and gatekeeping of senior reporters. They would validate the trustfulness of the news and information shared via Facebook. On 11 September, Facebook restricted Dot Dot News account; after launching an appeal, Facebook restored the page, but banned it again on 13 September. Dot Dot News launched a new page on 14 September, claiming censorship by Facebook.

On 13 September, their Facebook page was deleted again. Dot Dot News launch the pages of  2.0 and 3.0, but both were gradually deleted. Facebook warned that if they repeat their behaviour, the relevant personal account would also be banned.

On 20 September, They opened another Facebook page named 點新聞dotdotnewsmedia, and claimed they would fight against unreasonable suppression. Wen Wei Po criticized Facebook for suppressing the press freedom and cut the Hong Kong citizens from getting rational and patriotic messages. Dot Dot News' case was reported on by media outlets locally and across the globe including SCMP, CNN, Global Times as well as Pro-Beijing media outlets HKGPao and Silent Majority.

References

External links
 

2016 establishments in Hong Kong
Hong Kong news websites
Publications established in 2016
Chinese propaganda organisations